Dario Puccioni (born 16 September 1996) is an Italian racing cyclist, who most recently rode for UCI Continental team .

Major results
2018
 3rd GP Capodarco
 9th Overall Tour of Albania

References

External links
 

1996 births
Living people
Italian male cyclists
Place of birth missing (living people)
People from Empoli
Sportspeople from the Metropolitan City of Florence
Cyclists from Tuscany